Amasa Holcomb (1787–1875) was an American farmer, surveyor, civil engineer, businessman, politician, and manufacturer of surveying instruments and telescopes. From instruments he made he observed the total solar eclipse of June 16, 1806. He made astronomical computations from his observations and published almanacs for the partial solar eclipses of 1807 and 1808 from his work. An asteroid, 45512 Holcomb, was named after him.

Early life
Holcomb was born on June 18, 1787. Holcomb grew up in a town with three names in two states as a young child, but he never changed his residence due to border disputes and resolutions. The area known as "the jog" was called Simsbury, Connecticut, prior to 1768.  Later his birthplace was renamed Granby, Connecticut. The town kept this name until 1804 when the boundary between the states of Connecticut and Massachusetts was placed further south, and his birth town became known as Southwick, Massachusetts, where he grew up.

Holcomb was Elijah Holcomb Jr. and Lucy Holcomb and a descendant of the immigrant Thomas Holcomb. His paternal grandfather, also named Elijah, was the son of Nathaniel Holcomb  III. Holcomb's maternal grandfather was Silas Holcomb, son of Judah Holcomb  I and grandson of Nathaniel Holcomb  II. This grandfather married Mary Post; a daughter born in 1767 was Lucy Holcomb, Holcomb's mother.

There were no schools in his district, so he had no formal schooling but educated himself. He studied books on mathematics in earth measurement, land navigation, and the science of astronomical objects with optical instrumentation. These books had been owned by his uncle Abijah, who was lost at sea. At age fifteen, Holcomb became an instructor at a school in Suffield, Connecticut, teaching college preparatory courses to students older than himself.

Mid-life
Holcomb built a telescope in 1806 and could observe the total solar eclipse of June 16, 1806. He made astronomical computations in the four minutes he could see the stars during the eclipse. He published an almanac for 1807 and 1808 from his computations.

Holcomb was aged twenty when he wrote his almanacs of 1807 and 1808. He found Nehemiah Strong's almanac needed improvement, so he made computations to update it.  He did not predict the 1806 solar eclipse that he viewed that year, but he learned of its coming from others. Holcomb had made astronomical computations from the knowledge he had on hand and then predicted future eclipses. He published the almanac for 1807 and 1808 from his computations.

He went into surveying land as a business in about 1808 since he was familiar with optics and the associated surveying equipment. For a while, he also did private tutoring in surveying, optics, and astronomy. In about 1810, Holcomb decided to fabricate surveying instruments, compasses, and transit telescopes. July 2021In the 1820s, he manufactured sets of surveyors' instruments. His buyers were his students and others.  He also fabricated magnets, electrical apparatus, and leveling instruments for sale. He was quite successful in the surveying trade. However, he left it in 1825 and went into civil engineering.

Personal life 

Holcomb enjoyed climbing mountains and had excellent health. In 1808, he married Gillet Kendall of Granby, Connecticut. She was the daughter of Noadiah Kendall and well-liked thanks to her personality.

Holcomb did private tutoring in his house from time to time. He taught his students subjects for future careers, offering them the opportunity to make a living. He taught surveying to his student Julius Coy of Suffield, who went into that field. He taught Levi Coy, also from Suffield, navigation. Coy went to sea and became a ship captain. He taught astronomy to Benoni Bacon of Simsbury. Holcomb's student, Joseph King of Suffield, was taught surveying ass was his student Henry Merwin of Granby. Holcomb's student Jefferson Cooley was taught civil engineering and ultimately enrolled at Yale College to obtain a degree. The tutoring took up too much of his time, and he ultimately discontinued it to concentrate on his businesses. 

In 1816, Holcomb was selected as a founding father of his town. He held a city office position in Suffield for four years and occasionally in other elections. In 1831 he was a representative for Southwick in the Legislature of Massachusetts and served for three terms (1831, 1832, 1833). In 1852, he became a state senator from the Hampden district. He was Justice of the Peace for over 50 years in the county of Hampden, and had been a Methodist minister since 1831, preaching until he was 80 years old. Holcomb was also a trustee at Wesleyan University. In 1837 he received an honorary Master of Arts degree from Williams College. Holcomb died when he was 87 years old in March 1875.

Asteroid 45512 Holcomb, discovered by astronomers with the Catalina Sky Survey in 2000, was named after him.
The official  was published by the Minor Planet Center on November 8, 2019.

Holcomb's telescopes

Holcomb fabricated the first telescopes in the United States. The first reflecting telescope Holcomb made to order was for John A. Fulton of Chillicothe, Ohio, in about 1826. He fabricated and manufactured telescopes in earnest soon after, probably around 1826, which marked the first such manufacturing enterprise in the United States. He enjoyed making telescopes and at the beginning of his manufacturing venture he did not think of it becoming a profitable business.

The telescopes he made were in four sizes:
  long with a ten-inch (254 mm) aperture
  long with an eight-inch (203 mm) aperture
  long with a six-inch (152 mm) aperture
  long with a four-inch (102 mm) aperture

In 1830, Holcomb took an achromatic telescope to Professor Benjamin Silliman at Yale University in New Haven. After inspecting it, the professor ordered one for the university and published an article about it in the American Journal of Science. Around 1833, Holcomb began receiving orders for his telescopes. His telescopes built from 1834 through 1836 were inspected by The Franklin Institute of Philadelphia and given special awards for their outstanding quality. The committee that examined them included Robert M. Patterson (director of the United States Mint), Alexander D. Bach (coast survey superintendent), Dr Robert Hare (chemist), Sears Cook Walker, James Pollard Espy, and Isiah T. Lukens. In 1834, on the recommendation of The Franklin Institute, the City of Philadelphia awarded him the John Scott Award.

Holcomb made an  telescope in 1835 which was the largest telescope in the United States at that time. Holcomb's institutional customers included Brown University, the University of Delaware, and Williston Academy. Holcomb's telescopes went to the East Indies and another to the Hawaiian Islands. Holcomb was the only telescope manufacturer in the United States until Henry Fitz, and his associate Alvan Clark began producing refractor telescopes. Holcomb retired from this enterprise in 1846.

Legacy 
Holcomb's descendants donated two telescopes manufactured by Holcomb to the Smithsonian in 1933. Until then, they had been in the family at Southwick, Massachusetts. These were,
 Transit telescope, refractor,  in length and mounted on a fourteen-inch (360 mm) cross tube with a graduated marked circle, but missing the base.

References

Sources

Further reading 
 Davis, Maud. Historical Facts About Southwick. (1951) Self-published manuscript held at the Southwick Public Library. (Davis was Holcomb's great-granddaughter)
 Bagdasarian, Nicholas. "Amasa Holcomb: A Yankee Telescope Manufacturer." Sky & Telescope magazine, June 1986, p620-622.
 Holcomb, Fitz, & Peate: Three Nineteenth-Century American Telescope Manufacturers.  Museum of Technology History - Smithsonian

1787 births
1875 deaths
American astronomers
American scientific instrument makers
United States senators from Massachusetts
Methodists from Massachusetts
Wesleyan University people
People from Southwick, Massachusetts